The Loening XS2L was an American biplane scout amphibian developed by Keystone-Loening (then a subsidiary of Curtiss-Wright), for the United States Navy during the early 1930s.

Design and development
In the early 1930s the Navy became interested in exploring amphibious capabilities for its cruiser-based observation and scout floatplanes to remedy the problem of periodically having to rig the wheeled undercarriage and then revert to floats. After some experiments, installing retractable landing gear into the existing types' floats was ruled out due to degradation in performance. A purpose-built amphibian, however, was viewed as a potentially better solution.
 
Three companies – Great Lakes, Keystone-Loening and Sikorsky - submitted aircraft to meet the Navy's requirements, with their designs designated XSG-1, XS2L-1 and XSS-1 respectively.  The Loening's entry was a conventional biplane that featured flying boat hull, retractable main landing gear and a single R-985 Wasp Junior engine in a nacelle on the upper wing. The pilot and observer were seated in an enclosed cockpit that also encompassed some of the interplane struts, resulting in a curiously shaped glazing area.

The XS2L-1 was delivered for official trials in February 1933. Although it showed marginally better performance than its rivals, it still offered no considerable advantages over the existing floatplanes like the Vought O3U-3 and Berliner-Joyce OJ-2, and no production resulted.

Operators

United States Navy

Specifications (XS2L-1)

See also

References

Citations

External links
 Loening XS2L-1 photograph.

Single-engined tractor aircraft
Biplanes
1930s United States military reconnaissance aircraft
Amphibious aircraft
Aircraft first flown in 1933